Katalin Károlyi is a Hungarian mezzo-soprano, noted for singing in Baroque opera, particularly those directed by William Christie. Károlyi has made a number of recordings with Christie's Les Arts Florissants including Médée and La Descente d'Orphée aux Enfers by Marc-Antoine Charpentier on CD and the DVD recording of Il ritorno d'Ulisse in Patria by Claudio Monteverdi.

References

Living people
Hungarian opera singers
Year of birth missing (living people)